The Fondation Claude Monet  is a nonprofit organisation that runs and preserves the house and gardens of Claude Monet in Giverny, France, where Monet lived and painted for 43 years. Monet was inspired by his gardens, and spent years transforming them, planting thousands of flowers. He believed that it was important to surround himself with nature and paint outdoors. He created many paintings of his house and gardens, especially of water lilies in the pond, the Japanese bridge, and a weeping willow tree.

With a total of 530,000 visitors in 2010, it is the second most visited tourist site in Normandy after the island of Mont Saint-Michel. The house and gardens have been recognised as among the Maisons des Illustres, and a Jardin Remarquable, rewarding their outstanding qualities. The estate was classified as a monument historique in 1976.

Monet's paintings of the gardens, especially the sites' pond with water lilies, are exhibited in dozens of major collections.

History 

Claude Monet lived and painted in Giverny from 1883 to his death in 1926, and directed the renovation of the house, retaining its pink-painted walls. Colours from the painter's own palette were used for the interior -green for the doors and shutters, yellow in the dining room, complete with Japanese Prints from the 18th and 19th centuries, and blue for the kitchen. Monet had the nearby river Epte partially diverted for the gardens and hired up to seven gardeners to tend to it. Monet gained much of his inspiration from his gardens and believed it was important to surround himself with nature and paint outdoors. 

When Monet died in 1926, the entire estate was passed on to his son Michel. As he never spent time in Giverny, it was left to Blanche Hoschedé Monet, the daughter of Alice and the widow of Jean Monet, to look after the garden with the help of former head gardener Louis Lebret. After Blanche died in 1947, the garden was left untended.

Michel Monet died heirless in a car crash in 1966. He had bequeathed the estate to the Académie des beaux-arts. From 1977 onwards, then curator at the Palace of Versailles, played a key role in the restoration of the neglected house and gardens, which had been left in a desolate state. In a bid to raise funds, he and his wife Florence appealed to American donors through the "Versailles Foundation-Giverny Inc.". They, thereafter, dedicated themselves to its restoration. Substantial work needed to be done; the floors and ceiling beams were rotting while a staircase had already collapsed. Most of the window panes in both the greenhouse and main house had shattered long ago, and three large trees had begun to grow in the studio.  Walter Annenberg, an American philanthropist that owned Triangle Publications, funded an underpass for easier access to the water garden so that guests would no longer have to go across a busy road. 

The Fondation Claude Monet was created in 1980 as the estate was declared public. It soon became very successful and now welcomes both French and international visitors from April to November. 

When Gérald Van der Kemp died in 2001, Florence Van der Kemp became the curator of the Fondation Monet and continued renovating the property until her death in 2008.

Hugues Gall was appointed Director of the Fondation Claude Monet by the Académie des beaux-arts in March 2008.

As one of the most visited tourist destinations in France, strategies around ensuring long term protection for the garden are observed as a matter of protocol.

Restoration and donations 

Americans donated almost all of the $7 million needed to restore Monet's home and gardens at Giverny in the 1970s. These donations were part of American diplomacy to France since "France lacked the American tradition of private giving as well as the tax concessions that encourage it." Starting in 1969, under U.S. President Richard M. Nixon, Americans could claim tax deductions for their contributions to charities and this in turn aided the preservation of France's architectural heritage. Nixon encouraged Americans to donate to France. "I felt that encouraging Americans to contribute to the heritage of France, one of our oldest allies, would be one way to remind ourselves that the past in many ways is infinitely more important than the present." For his service, Nixon was inducted into the Academie des Beaux-Arts as one of the 15 foreign members, following former President Dwight D. Eisenhower's induction in 1952. 

The next ten years were spent restoring the garden and the house to their former state. Not much was left after the second World War. "The greenhouse panes and the windows in the house were reduced to shards after the bombings. Floors and ceiling beams had rotted away,  a staircase had collapsed. Three trees were even growing in the big studio. The pond had to be dug again. In the Clos normand, soil was removed to find the original ground level. Then the same flower species as those discovered by Monet in his time were planted."

British gardener James Priest, who has been in charge of restorations made to Monet's garden, taught himself the ways of the painter, particularly Monet's watercoloring. In 2014 Priest reported that although the garden was disfigured by some previous gardeners and is worn-down from time, it is still beautiful and has potential. He says that the lily-ponds remained in a similar state, and that Monet's color palette needs restoration in terms of returning the graded cool tones to the flower beds.

House 

Visitors have access to: 
 The ground floor: the blue salon (the reading room), the "épicerie" (the larder), the living room/studio, the dining room and the blue-tiled kitchen.
 The first floor: the family rooms, including Monet's which was renovated in March 2013 as well as Alice Hoschedé's bedroom and their private apartments. Also visible is the room of Blanche Hoschedé, which was recreated in 2013 based on archives and existing elements present in the house.
 The studio next to the home, where Monet painted his large Water Lilies paintings and murals, including those exhibited in Paris' Musée de l'Orangerie. This studio is now the Foundation's gift shop.

Gardens 

The Gardens are divided into two distinctive parts, which have been restored according to Monet's own specifications, the formal Clos-Normand and the water garden with the water lilies pond and a Japanese bridge.

The Clos-Normand was modelled after Monet's own artistic vision when he settled in Giverny. He spent years transforming the garden into a living en plein air painting, planting thousands of flowers in straight-lined patterns.

In 1893 Monet acquired a vacant piece of land across the road from the Clos-Normand which he then transformed into a water garden by diverting water from the stream Ru, an arm of the Epte river. That garden became famous during his lifetime with his series of monumental paintings of its water lilies, the Nymphéas. The water garden is marked by Monet's fascination for Japan, with its green Japanese bridge and oriental plants. The now famous water lilies were meticulously tended by a gardener employed for that sole purpose.

Representations of the garden by Claude Monet

The Japanese prints collection 

The majority of Monet's paintings are kept in the Musée Marmottan Monet. However, Monet's house is home to a collection of more than 200 Japanese ukiyo-e prints from the 18th and 19th centuries. Among the most notable pieces are works by Kitagawa Utamaro (1753–1806),  Katsushika Hokusai (1760–1849)  and Utagawa Hiroshige (1797–1858).

In popular culture
Much of the 2006 BBC docudrama The Impressionists, which is told from Claude Monet's viewpoint, was filmed at the home, gardens, and pond.

See also
 Musée Marmottan Monet, Paris
 List of single-artist museums

References

Bibliography 
 Claire Joyes, Claude Monet à Giverny, la visite et la mémoire des lieux, Éditions Claude Monet/Gourcuff/Gradenigo, 2010, 
 Hélène Rochette, Maisons d'écrivains et d'artistes. Paris et ses alentours, pp. 224–229, Parigramme, Paris, 2004,

External links 

 Fondation Monet website
 Monet's Years at Giverny: Beyond Impressionism, exhibition catalog fully online as PDF from The Metropolitan Museum of Art

Monet, Giverny
Giverny
Biographical museums in France
Monet, Giverny
Gardens in France
Garden museums
Japanese gardens
Monet
Maisons des Illustres
Open-air museums in France